Halaib, is a Red Sea port and town, located in the Halaib Triangle, a  area disputed between Egypt and Sudan. The town lies on the southern tip of what Egyptians refer to as the Red Sea Riviera and the north eastern corner of Sudan's Red Sea State and is near the ruins of medieval ʽAydhab. De facto control of the area is held by the Egyptian government.

Name
The name Halaib represents Arabic . The spellings Halayeb, Hala'ib, and Halayib are also found.

Ecology and geography
In the Halaib region, Afrotropical elements have their northern limits at Gabal Elba, making it a unique region among the regions dominating  North African ecosystems. There is also dense cover of acacias, mangroves and other shrubs, in addition to endemic species of plants such as Biscutella elbensis.

The highest peaks in the area are Mount Elba, Mount Shellal, Mount Shendib and Mount Shendodai.

Climate

See also
Halaib Triangle
Shalateen

References
Notes

Populated places in Red Sea Governorate